The name Bishop Fenwick High School may mean:

Bishop Fenwick High School (Peabody, Massachusetts)
Bishop Fenwick High School (Franklin, Ohio)
William V. Fisher Catholic High School, originally known as Fenwick High School, in Lancaster, Ohio

See also 
 Fenwick High School (disambiguation)